Fred Malekian is a retired Iranian Armenian football player.

References

Living people
People from Tehran
Ethnic Armenian sportspeople
Iranian footballers
Iranian people of Armenian descent
F.C. Ararat Tehran players
Esteghlal F.C. players
Azadegan League players
Association football forwards
1974 births